1934 in professional wrestling describes the year's events in the world of professional wrestling.

List of notable promotions 
Only one promotion held notable shows in 1934.

Calendar of notable shows

Championship changes

EMLL

Debuts
Debut date uncertain:
Bobby Bonales
January 28  Firpo Segura
April 5  Lou Thesz
April 12  Tarzán López
June 28  El Santo
October  Octavio Gaona

Births
Date of birth uncertain:
Armand Hussein(died in 2007) 
Don Carson(died in 2012) 
Karl Von Steiger (died in 2022) 
January 2  Alberto Torres (wrestler)(died in 1971) 
March 3  Bobby Fields(died in 2011) 
April 2  Brian Glover (died in 1997) 
April 6  Anton Geesink (died in 2010) 
April 9  Les Thornton(died in 2019) 
April 18  Little Beaver(died in 1995)
April 19  Ox Baker(died in 2014)
May 4  Sam Steamboat(died in 2006) 
May 5  Mr. Fuji(died in 2016)
May 13  Killer Karl Krupp(died in 1995) 
May 27  Sandy Scott(died in 2010)
June 9  Don Manoukian(died in 2014)
June 11  John da Silva (died in 2021)
June 18  Great Goliath(died in 2004) 
July 28  Mr. Wrestling (died in 2002)
August 1  Eric the Red (died in 1978) 
August 3  Haystacks Calhoun(died in 1989)
August 11  Penny Banner(died in 2008)
August 19  Bob Konovsky (died in 1982) 
August 27  Reggie Parks(died in 2021) 
September 10  Mr. Wrestling II(died in 2020) 
September 29  Skandar Akbar(died in 2010)
October 24  Sapphire(died in 1996)
December 6  Nick Bockwinkel(died in 2015) 
December 12  José Lothario(died in 2018)

Deaths
January 3  Alex Munro, 63

References

 
professional wrestling